Choi Jin-hyuk (born Kim Tae-ho, February 9, 1986) is a South Korean actor. He gained attention for his supporting roles in Gu Family Book and The Heirs, and then went on to star in lead roles in Emergency Couple, Pride and Prejudice, Tunnel, Devilish Charm, The Last Empress, and Rugal.

Career
Kim Tae-ho launched his acting career after he won the grand prize in the KBS reality talent show Survival Star Audition in 2006.
He began using the stage name Choi Jin-hyuk in 2010, prior to the airing of family drama It's Okay, Daddy's Girl, in which he was cast in his first leading role. He also starred in the romantic comedies I Need Romance (2011), and Miss Panda and Mr. Hedgehog (2012). Choi made his big-screen debut in the romance film Love Clinique.

His breakout came in 2013 after a well-received appearance on fantasy-period drama Gu Family Book. Afterwards, Choi landed supporting roles in two high-profile projects: writer Kim Eun-sook's trendy drama The Heirs, and the action film The Divine Move. His costar in The Divine Move, Jung Woo-sung also directed him in the short film Beginning of a Dream (Choi had joined Jung's agency Red Brick House).

In 2014, he headlined his first miniseries, the cable romantic comedy/medical drama Emergency Couple. Choi then returned to network television with a supporting role in You Are My Destiny, a remake of the 2008 Taiwanese drama. Another leading role followed with the legal drama Pride and Prejudice. He was also cast in a minor role in the Japanese film Koisuru Vampire ("Vampire in Love").

Choi went on a hiatus from acting when he enlisted for mandatory military service on March 31, 2015. He had the option to join the Seoul Police Promotional Team, the theater unit under the Seoul Metropolitan Police Agency, but choose to serve as an active duty soldier. He was discharged from the army after just seven months due to a knee injury. 

Choi made his return with the crime thriller Tunnel, which was a hit in China. In 2018, he was cast in the romantic comedy drama Devilish Charm, and mystery thriller series The Last Empress.

In 2019, Choi was cast in the thriller drama Justice.

In 2020, Choi starred in the science fiction action drama Rugal and Zombie Detective. He also made special appearance in TVN smash-hit drama Mr. Queen as an arrogant and flirty chef whose soul was trapped in Shin Hye-sun's body back in Joseon era. He also lend his voice for Shin Hye-sun's character's inner thought for first 7 episodes.

In 2023, Choi will hold a fan meeting 'With You' in Taiwan in February.

Filmography

Film

Television series

Television shows

Music video

Discography

Singles

Awards and nominations

Notes

References

External links
 
 Choi Jin-hyuk at Red Brick House 
 
 

1986 births
Living people
People from Mokpo
South Korean male film actors
South Korean male television actors
21st-century South Korean male actors